Arthur James Burn (1 June 1879 – 28 December 1911) was a Canadian long-distance runner. He competed in the men's marathon at the 1908 Summer Olympics. He died in December 1911, at the age of 35.

References

1879 births
1911 deaths
Athletes (track and field) at the 1908 Summer Olympics
Canadian male long-distance runners
Canadian male marathon runners
Olympic track and field athletes of Canada
Athletes from Calgary